The Best Of is a Spanish compilation of the American band Poco, released in 1980.

Track listing
"Bad Weather" (Paul Cotton) – 5:02
"Railroad Days" (Cotton) – 3:35
"Ride The Country" (Cotton) – 6:25
"A Right Along" (Cotton) – 4:43
"C'mon [Live]" (Richie Furay) – 3:10
"Pickin' Up the Pieces" (Furay) – 3:20
"Just For Me And You" (Furay) – 3:37
"Rocky Mountain Breakdown" (Rusty Young) – 2:16
"A Man Like Me" (Furay) – 4:04
"Faith In The Families" (Cotton) – 3:43

Personnel
Jim Messina - guitar, vocals
Richie Furay - guitar, 12-string guitar, vocals
Rusty Young - steel guitar, banjo, dobro, guitar, piano
Randy Meisner - bass, guitar, vocals
George Grantham - drums, vocals
Timothy B. Schmit - bass, vocals
Paul Cotton - guitar, vocals

References 

Poco compilation albums
1980 greatest hits albums